M61 or M-61 may refer to:

In transportation:
M61 motorway, a motorway in England
M-61 (Michigan highway), a state highway in Michigan
M61, a class of locomotives built by NOHAB

In science:
Messier 61 (M61), a spiral galaxy in the Virgo Cluster

In firearms and military equipment:
M61 Vulcan, a rotary cannon developed for the United States Armed Forces and used in fighter aircraft and other applications
M61 (grenade), a fragmentation hand grenade used by the United States Armed Forces
M61 Skorpion, a Yugoslav designation for the CZ-Scorpion pistol
M61 gas mask, a gas mask used by the Finnish Defence Forces of which three variants were made